, also known by the abbreviated name Momoden, is a role-playing video game series in Japan featuring the character  from Japanese folklore, as well as other Japanese folklore characters such as Kintarō, Urashima Tarō, and Princess Kaguya (from The Tale of the Bamboo Cutter). The first game in franchise, 'Momotarō Densetsu, had shipped 1 million copies in Japan.

Started in 1987, the series was initially produced by Hudson Soft. Konami absorbed the company in 2012. In 2015, a rumor stated that the franchise was acquired by Nintendo, though no official word from either Nintendo or Konami has been given. Momotarō Densetsu has many sub-series, including Momotaro Dentetsu.

The franchise has sold  units, including the Momotaro Dentetsu spin-off series.

A Momotaro Densetsu anime series was also broadcast, which had its own spinoff, featuring a different storyline set in outer space. Both series were animated by Knack Productions.

Video games 
 (Famicom: 1987-10-26, Sharp X68000: 1988-02-26, PlayStation: 1998-12-23)
 (PC Engine: 1990-07-20)
 (PC Engine: 1990-12-22)
 (Game Boy: 1991-12-26, PC Engine: 1992-12-04, Famicom: 1993-12-17)
 (Super Famicom: 1993-12-24)
 (Game Boy Color: 2001-01-01)
 (i-mode: 2011-04-18, : 2011-04-28)
Momotaro Dentetsu spin-off series

References

External links
Official site
Momotaro games at Hudson.co.jp

Video game franchises introduced in 1987
Hudson Soft games
Japan-exclusive video games
Video game franchises
Game Boy games
Game Boy Color games
Knack Productions
Konami franchises
Nintendo Entertainment System games
PlayStation (console) games
X68000 games
Super Nintendo Entertainment System games
Super Nintendo Entertainment System-only games
TurboGrafx-16 games
TurboGrafx-16-only games
Video games based on Japanese mythology
Video games developed in Japan